Belcher Camp is a ghost town located in Ferry County, Washington, United States. The town is located on upper Lambert Creek, nearly ten miles northeast of Republic.  The town was founded around 1897 when Iron ore was discovered in the vicinity.  The Belcher Mountain Mining Company began operations in the area.  By 1906 the town had a population of about 72.  The  town contained a post office,  large bunkhouse for single miners, a general store, five or six houses and a railroad.  There was even a Belcher Mountain Railroad line.  Eventually the mine folded and the town disappeared.

References

External links
The Rocker Box: Ferry County, Washington, Ghost Towns
Friends of the Columbia Highlands: Ghost Towns of the Columbia Highlands

Ghost towns in Washington (state)
Populated places in Ferry County, Washington